Tarairiú ( Caratiú) is an extinct and very poorly known language of eastern Brazil. The Tarairiu nation was divided into several tribes: the Janduí, Kanindé, Paiaku (Pajacú, Bajacú), Jenipapo, Jenipabuçu, Javó, Kamaçu, Tukuriju, Ariu, and "Xukuru" / Xacó.

It was once spoken between the Assú River and Apodi River in Rio Grande do Norte.

Extinct varieties
Below is a list of extinct Tarairiú language varieties listed by Loukotka (1968), including names of unattested varieties.

Xoró - once spoken on the Apodi River, state of Rio Grande do Norte.
Janduí - once spoken between the Apodi River and Açú River, Rio Grande do Norte.
Payacu - once spoken in Rio Grande do Norte in the Serra do Coité, Serra de São Bento and Serra Calabouço between the Jaguaribe River and Apodi River.
Panatí - once spoken in the state of Paraíba in the Serra Panatí and near Villaflor.
Miñari - once spoken in the valley of the Apodi River, Rio Grande do Norte.
Panahi - language of the neighbors of the Miñari tribe, Rio Grande do Norte.
Canindé - once spoken at the sources of the Choró River, state of Ceará.
Genipapo - Portuguese name of an extinct language on the Choró River.
Camamu - once spoken on the Acaraú River, Ceará.
Itañá / Baturité - once spoken in the Serra de Baturité, Ceará.
Candodú - language of a neighboring tribe of the Jucá, Quixetó and Caratiú.
Caratiú - once spoken at the sources of the Poti River and in the valley of the Triá River, Ceará.
Camasú - once spoken in Ceará state at the sources of the Acaratí-guasú River
Acriú - once spoken on the left bank of the Acaraná River, Ceará.
Anasé - spoken in Ceará, on the right bank of the Acaraú River.

Classification
The language is attested only through a few word lists. A few words resemble those of neighboring Kariri (and other Macro-Je) and Xukuru languages, but not enough to support a genealogical connection. Kaufman (1994) reports that "not even Greenberg dares classify this language".

Vocabulary
Some of the recorded words:

Resemblances with Macro-Jê languages are in kebra 'stone' (Proto-Je *kɛn), kreká 'head' (*krã), koreké 'hand' (*-ĩkra), and poyá 'foot' (*par). Resemblances with Xukuru are kiro- 'fire' (Xukuru kiyo), kringó 'eat' (kringgo 'feed'), sok 'house' (šekh).

Loukotka (1968) gives three words in Tarairiú:

agh 'sun'
kén 'stone'
ake 'tobacco'

For a more extensive vocabulary list of Tarairiú by de Souza (2009), see the corresponding Portuguese article.

Lexical comparison
An alternative list of Tarairiú words compared with "Jê" dialects and Cariri, compiled by the Paraíba historian José Elias Barbosa Borges, is given in Medeiros (1999):

{| class="wikitable sortable"
! Portuguese gloss(original) !! English gloss(translated) !! Tarairiú !! Jê dialects !! Cariri
|-
| água || water || kaité || nko || dzu
|-
| cabeça || head || kreká || krã || tçambu
|-
| cabelo || hair || unj || sun || dü
|-
| casa || house || sekri || ikré || crá
|-
| comer || eat || kringó || khrem || ami
|-
| dormir || sleep || gon-yá || nogon || uni
|-
| filho || son || ako || ikra || inhurae
|-
| fogo || fire || kiró, kia || korru, kuwi || isu
|-
| mão || hand || koreke || bkhra || müsã
|-
| mulher || woman || krippó || mprom, piko || tidzi
|-
| nariz || nose || sikrin || khra || naembi
|-
| olho || eye || aço || nto || do
|-
| orelha || ear || bandulak || mpak || benhé
|-
| pé || foot || poiá || par || bü
|}

References 

 Juvandi de Souza Santos (2009): Cariri e tarairiú? Culturas tapuias nos sertoẽs da Paraíba (Tesis doctoral), Porto Alegre, Pontificia Universidade Católica Do Rio Grande do Sul.

Extinct languages of South America
Unclassified languages of South America
Indigenous languages of Northeastern Brazil